Chalcopoecila is a genus of beetles in the family Buprestidae, containing the following species:

 Chalcopoecila ornata (Gory, 1840)
 Chalcopoecila ornatissima (Cobos, 1957)

References

External links

Buprestidae genera
Taxa named by Edward Saunders (entomologist)